Ruellia macrantha, or Christmas pride, is a plant native to the cerrado vegetation of Brazil, which is usually used as an ornamental plant. This plant is cited in Flora Brasiliensis by Carl Friedrich Philipp von Martius.

External links
 
 
 List of taxa in the Virtual Herbarium Of The New York Botanical Garden: Ruellia macrantha
  List of taxa in the Embrapa Recursos Genéticos e Biotecnologia: Ruellia macrantha

Flora of Brazil
macrantha